Eva Fernández Brugués (born 5 May 1986) is a Spanish former tennis player.

On 19 October 2009, she reached her highest singles ranking of world No. 185 whilst her best doubles ranking by the Women's Tennis Association (WTA) was 336 on 12 September 2011. She won seven ITF tournaments and two in doubles.

She won a gold and a bronze medal in the 2009 Mediterranean Games at Pescara.

ITF Circuit finals

Singles: 15 (7–8)

Doubles: 4 (2–2)

Notes

References

External links
 
 

1986 births
Living people
People from Figueres
Sportspeople from the Province of Girona
Spanish female tennis players

Mediterranean Games gold medalists for Spain
Mediterranean Games bronze medalists for Spain
Competitors at the 2009 Mediterranean Games
Mediterranean Games medalists in tennis
Tennis players from Catalonia